William Berger, also known as Bill Berger and Wilhelm Berger, born Wilhelm Thomas Berger (June 20, 1928 – October 2, 1993) was an Austrian American actor, mostly associated with Euro and spaghetti Westerns, as well as travel documentaries.

Biography

Career

A former roommate of Keith Richards, his earliest work was in Broadway theatre, but while visiting Italy, he was cast in his first Western, Break Up, in 1965.  A series of Westerns followed, including Faccia a faccia (1967), Today We Kill, Tomorrow We Die! (1968), If You Meet Sartana Pray for Your Death (1968), Sabata (1969), and Keoma (1975). He also starred in the horror films Five Dolls for an August Moon, My Dear Killer, Monster Shark, and The Murder Clinic.

Berger was heavily into drug experimentation, which frequent co-star Brett Halsey said sometimes interfered with filming, recounting one incident where they were shooting a scene on horseback and without warning Berger leant forwards and slid off his horse. In the early 1970s, Berger spent some time in an Italian prison, having been wrongly accused of possession of hashish and cocaine, but resumed his acting career after his release.  His later fare included Super Fly T.N.T. (1973), Oil! (1977), Hercules (1983),  and The King's Whore (1990).  His 1985 memoirs, Half Way Home, recount his life to that point.

Berger collaborated with his good friend, famed Spanish horror film director Jesus Franco, appearing in seven of his films: The Sinister Eyes of Dr. Orloff, Night of the Killers, Faceless, Golden Temple Amazons, Love Letters of a Portuguese Nun, Dirty Game in Casablanca, and A Captain of 15 Years.

Personal life
William Berger was married five times and was father to five children (and adopted a sixth). 

He had three children with his first wife Marjorie Berger: daughters Carin Berger (born in 1952) and actress Debra Berger (born March 17, 1957), and son Wendell Nelson Berger (born December 28, 1972). After his marriage to Marjorie ended, he married actress Carolyn Lobravico. While Berger was busy with the filming of The Murder Clinic, Carolyn was arrested for drug possession. A diabetic, she died in prison from lack of insulin.

His third marriage was to singer and actress Hanja Kochansky. They had one child together, a son Kasimir Berger (born in London on October 7, 1974). Berger was also stepfather to actress Katya Berger, the daughter of Hanja Kochansky from a previous relationship. Berger starred with his son Kasimir in the TV miniseries Christopher Columbus and Tuareg – The Desert Warrior.

After his divorce from Kochansky, he married his fourth wife, Dörte Völz. With her, he had a son named Alexander Völz. 

His fifth and last marriage was to Linda Berger. 

William Berger died on October 2, 1993 in Los Angeles, California, of prostate cancer. Director Jesus Franco was particularly upset by his passing, speaking of his grief in various interviews. Franco mentioned in a DVD interview (an extra feature on the DVD The Sinister Eyes of Dr. Orloff) that Berger died from some type of brittle bone disease.

Selected filmography

Back Street (1961) - Airport Attendant (uncredited)
Von Ryan's Express (1965) - Man from the Gestapo (uncredited)
Break Up (1965) - Benny (segment "L'uomo dei 5 palloni") (uncredited)
Ringo's Big Night (1966) - Jack Balman / Ringo
The Murder Clinic (1966) - Dr. Robert Vance
Cisco (1966) - El Cisco
A Bullet for the General (1967) - Bill 'Niño' Tate (English version, voice, uncredited)
Her Harem (1967) - Mario
The Day the Fish Came Out (1967) - Man in Bed
Face to Face (1967) - Charley 'Chas' A. Siringo
Today We Kill, Tomorrow We Die! (1968) - Francis 'Colt' Moran
Every Bastard a King (1968) - Roy Hemmings
Il suo nome gridava vendetta (1968) - Sam Kellogg
If You Meet Sartana Pray for Your Death (1968) - Lasky
 (1968) - Velte
A Noose for Django (1969) - Everett 'Bible' Murdock
Köpfchen in das Wasser, Schwänzchen in die Höh''' (1969) - Grüner, FilmproduzentSabata (1969) - BanjoOmbre roventi (1970) - CalebLa colomba non deve volare (1970)Five Dolls for an August Moon (1970) - Prof. Gerry FarrellSartana in the Valley of Death (1970) - Lee Calloway aka SartanaThey Call Him Cemetery (1971) - DukeMy Dear Killer (1972) - Giorgio CanaveseThe Big Bust Out (1972) - Bob ShawLa vita in gioco (1972) - AndreaThe Sinister Eyes of Dr. Orloff (1973) - Dr. OrloffUna colt in mano al diavolo (1973) - Isaac McCorneyIl giustiziere di Dio (1973) - Padre Tony LangSuper Fly T.N.T. (1973) - Lefebre...E il terzo giorno arrivò il corvo (1973) - The CrowVerflucht dies Amerika (1973) - Doc HollidayFasthand (1973) - MachedoMan with the Golden Winchester (1973) - Mathias Boyd…altrimenti vi ammucchiamo (1973) - Angelo BiondoUn capitán de quince años (1974) - NegoroThree Tough Guys (1974) - Captain RyanSituation (1974) - RalfLa noche de los asesinos (1974) - Baron Simon TobiasLa merveilleuse visite (1974)Terminal (1974) - Rudolph ArnheimParapsycho – Spectrum of Fear (1975) - ProfessorThe Career of a Chambermaid (1976) - FranzNick the Sting (1976) - RoizmanIl colpaccio (1976)And Agnes Chose to Die (1976) - ClintoKeoma (1976) - William ShannonOil! (1977) - Bill MannLove Letters of a Portuguese Nun (1977) - Father VicenteCalifornia (1977) - Mr. PrestonPer questa notte (1977)Wifemistress (1977) - Count BrandiniPorco mondo (1978) - Senator AlbericiComincerà tutto un mattino: io donna tu donna (1978) - LucianoDie Totenschmecker (1979) - FelixI viaggiatori della sera (1979) - Cocky FontanaHolocaust parte seconda: i ricordi, i deliri, la vendetta (1980) - Col. HansDay of the Cobra (1980) - Jack GoldsmithRipacsok (1981)Bosco d'amore (1981)The Girl from Trieste (1982) - CharlyDiamond Connection (1982) - InspectorIronmaster (1983) - MogoHercules (1983) - King MinosIl momento dell'avventura (1983) - DoyleHanna K. (1983) - German journalistEl asesino llevaba medias negras (1984)Monster Shark (1984) - Prof. Donald West (1984) - Phillip MarboeMoving Targets (1984) - BroschatChristopher Columbus (1985, TV Mini-Series) - Francisco de BobadillaThe Adventures of Hercules (aka Hercules 2) (1985) - King MinosDirty Game in Casablanca (1985) - Dean BakerTex and the Lord of the Deep (1985) - Kit CarsonThe Berlin Affair (1985) - The ProfessorThe Fifth Missile (1986, TV Movie) - Dr. StricklandTarot (1986) - MittlerLes amazones du temple d'or (1986) - Uruck the Temple Guardian / PriestThe Death of Empedocles (1987) - KritiasControl (1987) - Mr. PetersonStrike Commando (1987) - Maj. Harriman (English version, voice, uncredited)Distant Lights (1987) - Dr. MontanariDjango Strikes Again (1987) - Old TimerHell Hunters (1988) - KarlThe Brother from Space (1988) - Colonel GrantAlien Terminator (1988) - Alonso QuinteroIl nido del ragno (1988) - Mysterious ManDial Help (1988) - Prof. Irving KleinBachi da seta (1988)Maya (1989) - Salomon SlivakI'm Dangerous Tonight (1990) - PenckLex Minister (1990)The King's Whore (1990) - Le Comte LonghiUn amore sconosciuto (1991) - PieroBuck ai confini del cielo (1991) - Grandpa ThomasBerlin '39 (1993) - Ernest18000 giorni fa'' (1993) - Rosenbaud (uncredited)

References

External links
 
 William Berger on a genealogical site

1928 births
1993 deaths
Actors from Innsbruck
Austrian emigrants to the United States
Male Spaghetti Western actors
20th-century Austrian male actors
Deaths from prostate cancer
Deaths from cancer in California